Gönen (also: Gönan) is a village in the Gerger District, Adıyaman Province, Turkey. The village is populated by Kurds of the Kirvar tribe and had a population of 156 in 2021.

The hamlets of Ballıca and Yumurtalık are attached to the village.

References

Villages in Gerger District
Kurdish settlements in Adıyaman Province